Dinometa is a monotypic moth genus in the family Lasiocampidae erected by Per Olof Christopher Aurivillius in 1927. Its only species, Dinometa maputuana, described by Wichgraf in 1906, is found in Mozambique, South Africa and Tanzania.

References 

Lasiocampinae
Moths of Sub-Saharan Africa
Lepidoptera of Mozambique
Lepidoptera of South Africa
Lepidoptera of Tanzania